Anubis is a genus of longhorn beetles belonging to the family Cerambycidae.

Species
 Anubis bipustulatus Thomson, 1865
 Anubis bohemani Gahan, 1894
 Anubis clavicornis (Fabricius, 1775)
 Anubis curtus Hüdepohl, 1990
 Anubis cyaneicollis (Pic, 1946)
 Anubis cyaneus Pic, 1924
 Anubis dissitus Bates, 1879
 Anubis hexastictus (Fairmaire, 1887)
 Anubis inermis (White, 1853)
 Anubis leptissimus Gressitt & Rondon, 1970
 Anubis manillarum (Chevrolat, 1838)
 Anubis mellyii (White, 1853)
 Anubis methneri Schmidt, 1922
 Anubis pubicollis (Pascoe, 1863)
 Anubis rostratus Bates, 1879
 Anubis scalaris (Pascoe, 1863)
 Anubis striatus (Gressitt & Rondon, 1970)
 Anubis subobtusus (Pic, 1932)
 Anubis suturalis Schwarzer, 1930
 Anubis umtaliensis Schmidt, 1922
 Anubis unifasciatus Bates, 1879
 Anubis viridicollis Pic, 1932
 Anubis vittatus Schmidt, 1922

References

Callichromatini